The following is the 2003–04 network television schedule for the six major English language commercial broadcast networks in the United States. The schedule covers primetime hours from September 2003 through August 2004. The schedule is followed by a list per network of returning series, new series, and series cancelled after the 2002–03 season. All times are Eastern and Pacific, with certain exceptions, such as Monday Night Football.

New series are highlighted in bold.

Each of the 30 highest-rated shows is listed with its rank and rating as determined by Nielsen Media Research.

 Yellow indicates the programs in the top 10 for the season.
 Cyan indicates the programs in the top 20 for the season.
 Magenta indicates the programs in the top 30 for the season.
Other Legend
 Light blue indicates local programming.
 Gray indicates encore programming.
 Blue-gray indicates news programming.
 Light green indicates sporting events.
 Light Purple indicates movies. 
 Red indicates series being burned off and other scheduled programs, including specials.

PBS is not included; member stations have local flexibility over most of their schedules and broadcast times for network shows may vary.

The 2003–2004 season marked the final time that the major networks scheduled substantial original scripted drama series on Saturdays. After years of declining ratings on that particular evening, beginning with the 2004–2005 season the networks ceased scheduling original dramas on Saturdays, choosing instead to fill the schedule with non-fiction programming and reruns.

From August 13 to 29, 2004, all of NBC's primetime programming was preempted in favor of coverage of the 2004 Summer Olympics.

Sunday

NOTE: On Fox, The Ortegas was supposed to air at 8:30-9, but it was cancelled.

Monday

Tuesday
{| class="wikitable" style="width:100%;margin-right:0;text-align:center"
|-
! colspan="2" style="background-color:#C0C0C0;text-align:center"| Network
! style="background-color:#C0C0C0;text-align:center"| 8:00 PM
! style="background-color:#C0C0C0;text-align:center"| 8:30 PM
! style="background-color:#C0C0C0;text-align:center"| 9:00 PM
! style="background-color:#C0C0C0;text-align:center"| 9:30 PM
! style="background-color:#C0C0C0;text-align:center"| 10:00 PM
! style="background-color:#C0C0C0;text-align:center"| 10:30 PM
|-
!rowspan="7"|ABC
! Fall
|rowspan="6"|8 Simple Rules
|rowspan="6"|I'm with Her
|rowspan="7"|According to Jim
|rowspan="3"|Less than Perfect
|colspan="2"|NYPD Blue
|-
! Winter
|colspan="2"|Line of Fire 
|-
! Follow Up
|colspan="2" rowspan="3"|NYPD Blue
|-
! Spring
| It's All Relative
|-
! Follow Up
|rowspan="3"|Less than Perfect
|-
! Summer
|colspan="2"|NYPD 24/7
|- 
! Mid-Summer
|colspan="2"|Extreme Makeover: Home Edition
|colspan="2"|In the Jury Room
|-
!rowspan="4"|CBS
!Fall
|bgcolor="#FF66FF" rowspan="4" colspan="2"|Navy: NCIS (#23/7.8)(Tied with The West Wing and the CBS Sunday Movie)
|colspan="2"|The Guardian
|bgcolor="#FF66FF" rowspan="3" colspan="2"|Judging Amy (#26/7.7)(Tied with Still Standing)
|-
!Spring
|colspan="2"|Century City
|-
!Follow Up
|colspan="2"|The Guardian
|-
!Mid-Summer
|colspan="2"|Big Brother
|colspan="2"|The Amazing Race
|-
!rowspan="6"|Fox
!Fall
|bgcolor="lightgreen" colspan="6"| MLB Post-Season Games / World Series
|-
! November
|rowspan="2" |That '70s Show
|That '70s Show
|colspan="2" rowspan="3"|24
|bgcolor="#abbfff" colspan="2" rowspan="5"| Local Programming
|-
! December
|The Simple Life
|-
! Winter
|bgcolor="#FFFF00" colspan="2"|American Idol (#2/14.9)
|-
! Summer
| The Bernie Mac Show
|Method & Red
|colspan="2"|The Jury
|-
! Mid-Summer
|colspan="2"|Trading Spouses: Meet Your New Mommy
|That '70s Show
|Quintuplets
|-
!rowspan="6"|NBC
!Fall
|Whoopi 
|Happy Family 
|bgcolor="#FF66FF" rowspan="4"|Frasier (#30/7.3)(Tied with The King of Queens)
|Good Morning, Miami
|bgcolor="#00FFFF" rowspan="6" colspan="2"|Law & Order: Special Victims Unit (#18/8.7)
|-
!Winter
|The Tracy Morgan Show
|Whoopi
|Happy Family
|-
!Follow-up
|Whoopi
|Happy Family
| rowspan="2"|Scrubs
|-
!Spring
| colspan="2"|Fear Factor
|-
!Summer
|colspan="2"|Next Action Star
|colspan="2" rowspan="2" |Last Comic Standing
|-
!Mid-Summer
|Scrubs
|Happy Family
|-
!rowspan="6"|UPN
!Fall
| rowspan="4"|One on One
| rowspan="4"|All of Us
| rowspan="2"|Rock Me Baby
|The Mullets
|bgcolor="#abbfff" colspan="2" rowspan="10"| Local Programming
|-
!Follow-up
|bgcolor="#C0C0C0" |Girlfriends (Repeats)
|-
!Winter
| colspan="2"|America's Next Top Model 2
|-
!Spring
|Rock Me Baby
|One on One
|-
!Summer
|rowspan="2"|All of Us
|rowspan="2"|Eve|colspan="2"|America's Next Top Model|-
! August
|colspan="2"|The Player|-
!rowspan="4"|The WB
!Fall
| colspan="2" rowspan="4"|Gilmore Girls
| colspan="2"|One Tree Hill|-
!Spring
| colspan="2"| High School Reunion
|-
! Follow Up
| colspan="2"|One Tree Hill|-
! Summer
| colspan="2"|Summerland|}NOTE: On The WB, Fearless was supposed to have started in the Fall at 9–10, but it was delayed to midseason, then it was cancelled both due to production difficulties.

Wednesday

ThursdayNOTE: On Fox, The O.C. was supposed to air at 9-10 after Tru Calling, but at the last minute stick with repeats.

Friday

Saturday

By network
ABCReturning series8 Simple Rules
20/20
According to Jim
Alias
America's Funniest Home Videos
The Bachelor
The Bachelorette
Dragnet
The Drew Carey Show
Extreme Makeover
George Lopez
Less than Perfect
Life with Bonnie
The Mole
Monday Night Football
My Wife and Kids
NYPD Blue
The Practice
Primetime
Whose Line Is It Anyway?
The Wonderful World of DisneyNew series10-8: Officers on Duty *The Big House *The D.A. *Extreme Makeover: Home Edition *Hope & FaithI'm with HerIn the Jury Room *It's All RelativeKaren SiscoKingdom Hospital *Line of Fire *Married to the KellysNYPD 24/7 *Threat MatrixThe Ultimate Love Test *Weddings Gone Wacky, Wonderful & Wild: Anything for Love *Not returning from 2002-03The Family
Lost at Home
MDs
Miracles
Push, Nevada
Regular Joe
That Was Then
Veritas: The Quest

CBSReturning series48 Hours
60 Minutes
60 Minutes II
The Amazing Race
Becker
Big Brother
CBS Sunday Movie
CSI: Crime Scene Investigation
CSI: Miami
The District
Everybody Loves Raymond
The Guardian
Hack
JAG
Judging Amy
The King of Queens
Still Standing
Star Search
Survivor
Without a Trace
Yes, DearNew seriesThe Brotherhood of Poland, New HampshireCentury City *Cold CaseThe HandlerJoan of ArcadiaNCISThe Stones *Two and a Half MenNot returning from 2002-03The Agency
Baby Bob
Bram & Alice
Charlie Lawrence
My Big Fat Greek Life
Presidio Med
Queens Supreme
Robbery Homicide Division
Touched by an Angel

FoxReturning series:24
American Idol
America's Most Wanted
The Bernie Mac Show
Boston Public
Cops
Joe Millionaire
King of the Hill
Malcolm in the Middle
Oliver Beene
The Simpsons
That '70s Show
Wanda at LargeNew series:Arrested DevelopmentThe Casino *Cracking Up *Forever Eden *The Jury *LuisMethod & Red *A Minute with Stan HooperMy Big Fat Obnoxious Fiance *The O.C.Playing It Straight *Quintuplets *The Simple Life *SkinThe Swan *Totally Outrageous BehaviorTru CallingWonderfalls *Not returning from 2002-03:30 Seconds to Fame
Andy Richter Controls the Universe
Anything for Love
American Juniors
Cedric the Entertainer Presents
Fastlane
Firefly
Futurama (revived and moved to Comedy Central in 2008)
Girls Club
The Grubbs
John Doe
Keen Eddie
Married by America
Mr. Personality
Paradise Hotel (revived in 2018–19)
The Pitts
septuplets
Stupid Behavior Caught on Tape
Temptation Island (revived in 2019 on USA)

NBCReturning series:American Dreams
Boomtown
Crime & Punishment
Crossing Jordan
Dateline NBC
Ed
ER
Fear Factor
Frasier
For Love or Money
Friends
Good Morning, Miami
Last Comic Standing
Law & Order
Law & Order: Criminal Intent
Law & Order: Special Victims Unit
The Restaurant
Scrubs
Third Watch
The West Wing
Who Wants to Marry My Dad?
Will & GraceNew series:The Apprentice *Average JoeCome to Papa *CouplingHappy FamilyLas VegasThe Lyon's DenMiss MatchNext Action Star *The Tracy Morgan Show *WhoopiNot returning from 2002-03:America's Most Talented Kid
A.U.S.A.
Dog Eat Dog
Fame
Hidden Hills
Hunter
In-Laws
Just Shoot Me!
Kingpin
Meet My Folks
Mister Sterling
Providence
Race to the Altar
Watching Ellie

UPNReturning seriesAmerica's Next Top Model
Girlfriends
Half & Half
One on One
The Parkers
Star Trek: Enterprise
UPN's Night at the Movies
WWE SmackDownNew seriesAll of UsAmish in the City *EveGame Over *I'm Still Alive *Jake 2.0The MulletsThe Player *Rock Me BabyNot returning from 2002-03Abby
Buffy the Vampire Slayer
Haunted
Platinum
The Twilight Zone

The WBReturning series7th Heaven
Angel
Charmed
Everwood
Flix from the Frog
Gilmore Girls
Grounded for Life
High School Reunion
The Jamie Kennedy Experiment
Reba
Smallville
The Surreal Life
What I Like About YouNew seriesAll About the AndersonsBlue Collar TV *The HelpLike FamilyOne Tree HillRun of the HouseSteve Harvey's Big Time ChallengeStudio 7 *Summerland *Superstar USA *TarzanNot returning from 2002-03'Birds of PreyBlack SashDawson's CreekDo OverFamily AffairGreetings from TucsonThe O'KeefesOn the SpotSabrina the Teenage Witch''

Note: The * indicates that the program was introduced in midseason.

References

United States primetime network television schedules
United States Network Television Schedule, 2003-04
United States Network Television Schedule, 2003-04